The New Jersey Devils are a professional ice hockey team based in Newark, New Jersey. The team is a member of the Metropolitan Division of the Eastern Conference of the National Hockey League (NHL). The Devils arrived in New Jersey in 1982 after transferring from Denver, Colorado, where they had been known as the Colorado Rockies since 1976. Before that, the franchise entered the league as the Kansas City Scouts in 1974. The 2021–22 season is the 39th season of play in New Jersey. It is the 47th year for the Devils franchise, and including the team's time in Kansas City and Denver, the Devils have won over 1,500 regular season games, 17th overall in NHL history.

New Jersey played its first 11 seasons in the Patrick Division before moving to the Atlantic Division when the NHL renamed divisions in 1993. The Devils first qualified for the playoffs in 1988, eventually losing in the Conference Finals. The team then made the playoffs several times after that before capturing their first Stanley Cup in the lockout-shortened 1994–95 season. The following year, the Devils missed the playoffs, becoming the first team in 26 years to fail to qualify for the playoffs the season after a Stanley Cup victory. Since 1997, however, the Devils qualified for the playoffs each season until 2010–11, a streak surpassed only by the Detroit Red Wings. The Devils won the Stanley Cup in 2000 and 2003, and advanced to the Finals in 2001, only to lose to the Colorado Avalanche in seven games. Overall, the Devils made 22 appearances in the Stanley Cup playoffs, in the 24 seasons between 1987–88 and 2011–12, including 13 consecutive seasons between 1996–97 and 2009–10. After missing the playoffs for the first time in 14 years in 2010–11, the Devils rebounded the following year, making the playoffs again and losing in the Stanley Cup Finals to the Los Angeles Kings. Following this run the Devils had trouble finding success as they missed the playoffs nine times in the following ten seasons.

Table key

Year by year

Notes
  In 1992, the NHL expanded the season to 84 games, and each team played two games at a neutral site. After the 1995 lockout, the neutral site games were eliminated, and the season was reduced to 82 games.
  The NHL realigned into Eastern and Western Conferences prior to the 1993–94 season. New Jersey was placed in the Atlantic Division of the Eastern Conference.
  Both seasons were shortened to 48 games because of lockouts - the 1994–95 NHL lockout, finished on January 11, 1995, and the 2012–13 NHL lockout, finished on January 6, 2013.
  Beginning with the 1999–2000 season, teams received one point for losing a regular season game in overtime.
  The season was canceled because of the 2004–05 NHL lockout.
  Beginning with the 2005–06 season, the NHL instituted a penalty shootout for regular season games that remained tied after a five-minute overtime period, which prevented ties.
  The 2019–20 regular season officially ended in May due to the COVID-19 pandemic, with the remaining regular season games from March and April being cancelled.
  Due to the COVID-19 pandemic, the 2020–21 NHL season was shortened to 56 games.

References
General
 
 

Specific

 
seasons
National Hockey League team seasons
New Jersey Devils